José Luís da Cruz Vidigal (born 15 March 1973) is a Portuguese retired footballer who played as a defensive midfielder.

During his extensive professional career, the no-nonsense midfield battler played more years abroad (Italy, eight) than in his country of adoption (seven), where he represented mainly Sporting.

A Portugal international for two years, Vidigal appeared with the national team at Euro 2000, helping them to the third place.

Club career

Early years / Sporting
Born in Sá da Bandeira, Portuguese Angola, Vidigal moved to Portugal at an early age, and started his footballing career with amateurs O Elvas CAD, moving in 1994 to the second division with G.D. Estoril-Praia.

The following year, Vidigal signed with another team from the Lisbon area, Sporting CP in the Primeira Liga. After tentative beginnings he became an essential defensive unit, contributing with a career-best – in Portugal – 32 games as the Lions won their first title in 18 years.

Italy spell
At 27, Vidigal moved to Italy, where he would remain the following eight years. He started out with S.S.C. Napoli after signing along Sporting teammates Facundo Quiroga and Abdelilah Saber, but only played in four Serie A matches in his first year and the team was also relegated (his best individual year – 33 appearances, five goals – was incidentally spent in the Serie B, but they faced another relegation, eventually ending 16th).

Napoli finished higher in 2003–04, but was finally relegated off the pitch. Upon this, Vidigal moved to fellow league side A.S. Livorno Calcio, starting throughout most of the season and helping to a comfortable ninth position.

Vidigal was irregularly used in his final three years, often from the bench, representing Udinese Calcio (one year) and returning to Livorno where he played until 2008.

Return to Portugal
Vidigal returned to his country aged 35, joining modest C.F. Estrela da Amadora where his older brother Lito was coach. In his first game, on 28 September 2008, he scored twice to help beat C.D. Nacional 2–1; however, he missed most of the season due to injury as the capital-based club was also immerse in a severe financial crisis – eventually being relegated from the top flight to the third level; he retired from the game shortly after.

International career
Vidigal earned 15 caps for Portugal, his first one being on 23 February 2000 in a 1–1 draw with Belgium at Charleroi, in a friendly match. Summoned to UEFA Euro 2000, he had to battle for position with Paulo Bento and Costinha (Paulo Sousa was also called, but was injured), but managed to appear in four games for the national team, including the semi-final loss against France.

Vidigal's last match came on 12 October 2002 in the 1–1 draw with Tunisia played in Lisbon, in another friendly. He also represented the nation at the 1996 Summer Olympics, playing all the games en route to the fourth place.

Personal life
Vidigal was the second of 13 children, four of his brothers also being footballers: Beto, Lito (whom represented Angola internationally), Toni and Jorge. His nephew, André, was also involved in the sport professionally.

References

External links
 
 
 
 José Luis Vidigal at Futbol Mercado 
 

1973 births
Living people
People from Lubango
Portuguese sportspeople of Angolan descent
Colonial people in Angola
Black Portuguese sportspeople
Portuguese footballers
Association football midfielders
Primeira Liga players
Liga Portugal 2 players
Segunda Divisão players
O Elvas C.A.D. players
G.D. Estoril Praia players
Sporting CP footballers
C.F. Estrela da Amadora players
Serie A players
Serie B players
S.S.C. Napoli players
U.S. Livorno 1915 players
Udinese Calcio players
Portugal under-21 international footballers
Portugal international footballers
UEFA Euro 2000 players
Footballers at the 1996 Summer Olympics
Olympic footballers of Portugal
Portuguese expatriate footballers
Expatriate footballers in Italy
Portuguese expatriate sportspeople in Italy